This Way Up is a British comedy-drama television series broadcast on Channel 4. It is set in London, and is written by and stars Aisling Bea. Sharon Horgan who also stars in the series is the executive-producer.

The first series was shown in 2019, and the second in 2021. The series is distributed in the United States on Hulu.

Premise 
In This Way Up Bea plays a young, single Irish woman, Áine, who lives in London and is recovering from a nervous breakdown. She works as a teacher of English as a second language, and in series 2 she has a relationship with the father of a child she is tutoring. Horgan plays Áine's protective elder sister, Shona, who lives with her male partner but is also sexually attracted to a female colleague.

Cast

Main 
Aisling Bea as Áine
Sharon Horgan as Shona, Áine's sister
Dorian Grover as Étienne, Áine's 14-year-old French pupil
Tobias Menzies as Richard, Étienne's father
Aasif Mandvi as Vish, Shona's partner
Indira Varma as Charlotte, Shona's colleague
Kadiff Kirwan as Bradley, Áine's flatmate

Recurring 
Chris Geere as Freddie, Áine's ex-boyfriend
Ricky Grover as Tom, Áine's friend from rehab
Ekow Quartey as James, Áine's boss
Pik-Sen Lim as Chien, one of Áine's students

Guest
Sorcha Cusack as Eileen, Áine and Shona's mother
Lou Sanders as Fran, a psychic Áine visits
Jeff Mirza as Hari, Vish's father
Soni Razdan as Kavita, Vish's mother
Tom Bell as David, Áine and Shona's Cousin

Episodes

Series 1 (2019)

Series 2 (2021)

Reception 
On Rotten Tomatoes, series 1 has an approval rating of 90% based on reviews from 20 critics. The site's consensus describes the show as "Devastating, hilarious, and surprisingly light, This Way Up captures the complexities of mental health with an empathetic – if at times wandering – eye." Bustle compared it positively with Fleabag. It also gained comparisons with Back to Life and Catastrophe. The Daily Telegraph called This Way Up "one of the best new shows of the year", awarding it five stars. In The Hollywood Reporter, Daniel Fienberg was less positive, but called it a "solid and familiar blend of comic and melancholic". The Atlantic praised the show, calling it "small in scope, infinitely charming, and intermittently devastating".

At the 2020 BAFTA Television Craft Awards, Bea won the Breakthrough Talent Award and in 2022 was nominated for Best Female Comedy Performance at the British Academy Television Awards.

Future 
In May 2020, while appearing on Richard Herring's podcast, Bea confirmed that there would be a second series of the show. On 20 November 2020 the series was officially renewed for a second series. The second series premiered in the US on Hulu on 9 July 2021 and in the UK on Channel 4 on 14 July 2021.

References

External links 
 This Way Up on Channel 4
This Way Up at IMDb

2019 British television series debuts
2010s British black comedy television series
2010s British comedy-drama television series
2010s British LGBT-related comedy television series
2020s British black comedy television series
2020s British comedy-drama television series
2020s British LGBT-related comedy television series
Bisexuality-related television series
Channel 4 comedy dramas
Irish diaspora
Television about mental health
Television series about educators
Television series about sisters
Television shows set in London